Chester David Hartranft (15 October 1839 in Frederick Township, Montgomery County, Pennsylvania – 30 December 1914 in Germany) was a United States educator.

Biography
He was educated at the University of Pennsylvania in 1861 and at the New Brunswick Theological Seminary in 1864; was pastor of the Dutch Reformed church at South Bushwick, New York, in 1864-66, and of that in New Brunswick, New Jersey, in 1866-78. He was, at one time, president of the Conservatory of Music at New Brunswick.

In 1879 he was appointed professor of ecclesiastical history at the Hartford Theological Seminary. In 1888, he was elected its president, and held the chair of Biblical theology in the years 1892-97 and of ecclesiastical dogmatics from 1897 to 1903. He resigned the presidency in 1903 to engage in literary work in Germany. He died in Wolfenbüttel, where he was buried.

Notes

References

Norwich Bulletin, January 21, 1915
The Central New Jersey Home News, January 22, 1915
The Central New Jersey Home News, May 18, 1915

External links
Chester David Hartranft: Memorial Addresses (1915) transcribed by Richard Mammana 2022

1839 births
1914 deaths
University of Pennsylvania alumni
Hartford Seminary faculty
New Brunswick Theological Seminary alumni
Heads of universities and colleges in the United States